The Avinashi Road Elevated Expressway is a , four-lane, elevated expressway under construction in the city of Coimbatore, Tamil Nadu, India. The corridor begins near the Uppilipalayam Flyover and ends near the Goldwins junction over the Avinashi Road, the most important arterial road in the city, bypassing over 12 traffic intersections. Upon completion, this would be the longest elevated corridor in Tamil Nadu, and the second longest in India after the P. V. Narasimha Rao Expressway.

History
The project was sanctioned in June 2020 when the Tamil Nadu Government gave its 'in principle' approval to the National Highways Authority of India (NHAI) for the elevated expressway. 

The expressway starts near the eastern end of the Uppilipalayam Flyover and ends before the Goldwins Junction. It would run over the Avinashi Road, the most important arterial road in the city bypassing over 12 traffic intersections. There would be a total of four entry and exit ramps as part of the project.

Structure
The four-lane flyover covering a distance of 10 km would decongest the Avinashi Road, the most important arterial road in the city by bypassing over 12 traffic intersections. The flyover would be built over the current operational flyover at Hope College junction and minor bridges near Peelamedu and Nava India junctions.
The flyover will have entry and exit ramps in the Anna Statue, Peelamedu, Hopes College, and Nava India junctions to facilitate the vehicular movement and distribution to other arterial roads.

Costing
On the cost front, ₹300 crore will be the amount for land acquisition and ₹700 crore for the main bridge. Another ₹500 crore will be to reconstruct or widen some of the existing bridges on Avinashi Road, construction of service roads and improvement of junctions.

Bypassed Traffic Intersections
Park gate
Anna Silai
GKNM Signal
Lakshmi Mills
Nava India
ESSO bunk
PSG Tech
Krishnammal College
Fun Republic Mall
Hopes College
Tidel Park Signal
Airport Signal

References

Expressways in Tamil Nadu
Proposed roads in India
Bridges in Tamil Nadu
Transport in Coimbatore